Żarki Średnie  is a village in the administrative district of Gmina Pieńsk, within Zgorzelec County, Lower Silesian Voivodeship, in south-western Poland, close to the German border. 

The village has an approximate population of 630.

References

Villages in Zgorzelec County